Polyphony is a small English choir formed by Stephen Layton for one particular concert put on in King's College, Cambridge in 1986. They have released many critically acclaimed recordings, the most recent of which is Esenvalds - Passion & Resurrection. They record and perform a wide range of music mainly on Hyperion Records. Every year they perform Handel's Messiah and Bach's St John Passion in St John's Smith Square to sell-out audiences. Many of their recordings have been Gramophone editor's choice.

Including many talented musicians such as Tom Williams (English counter tenor), Polyphony have performed many times in the BBC Proms and performed works by John Tavener on his 60th Birthday in the Barbican as part of its Great Performers series. They have also premiered and released prominent recordings of the music of Arvo Pärt.

Stephen Layton

The director of Polyphony, Stephen Layton founded the choir in 1986 and has directed it since. He is also the director of the choir of Trinity College, Cambridge.

Recordings
 Bruckner: Mass in E Minor and Motets
 Whitacre: Cloudburst and other Choral Works
 A Christmas Present from Polyphony
 O Magnum Mysterium
 Lauridsen: Nocturnes
 Lauridsen: Lux Aeterna
 Part: Triodion
 Jackson: Not No Faceless Angel
 Tavener: Choral Works
 Rutter: Music for Christmas
 Rutter: Requiem
 Britten: Sacred and Profane
 Esenvalds: Passion and Resurrection

External links

Cambridge choirs
Musical groups established in 1986
1986 establishments in England
King's College, Cambridge